Gregory James Smits (born 1960) is an American historian, academic, writer and Japanologist.  He is a professor of Japanese history at Pennsylvania State University.

Early life
Smits was born in Columbia, Missouri.  He earned a BA from the University of Florida in 1983.  He was awarded a master's degree from the University of Hawaii at Manoa.  The University of Southern California granted his Ph.D.

Select works
Smit's published writings encompass 8 works in 18 publications in 2 languages and 1,101 library holdings.

 The sages' scale in Japan: Nakae Tōju (1608-1648) and situational weighing, 1991
 Visions of Ryukyu identity and ideology in early-modern thought and politics, 1999
 Jahana Noboru: Ikinawan activist and scholar, 2002 
 The politics of culture in early twentieth century Okinawa, 2006
 Economic thought in early modern Japan, 2010

References

External links
  Smits faculty website 

American Japanologists
Pennsylvania State University faculty
Living people
1960 births
21st-century American historians
21st-century American male writers
American male non-fiction writers